HLA class II histocompatibility antigen, DRB1 beta chain is a protein that in humans is encoded by the HLA-DRB1 gene. DRB1 encodes the most prevalent beta subunit of HLA-DR. DRB1 alleles, especially those encoding amino acid sequence changes at positions 11 and 13, are associated risk of rheumatoid arthritis.

Function 
The protein encoded by this gene belongs to the HLA class II beta chain paralogues. The class II molecule is a heterodimer consisting of an alpha (DRA) and a beta chain (DRB), both anchored in the membrane. It plays a central role in the immune system by presenting peptides derived from extracellular proteins to T helper cells. Class II molecules are constitutively expressed in professional antigen-presenting cells (APC: B lymphocytes, dendritic cells, macrophages), and could be induced in non-professional APCs.

There is evidence it is associated with reduced severity of COVID-19 disease.

Gene structure and polymorphisms 
The beta chain is approximately 26-28 kDa. It is encoded by 6 exons, exon one encodes the leader peptide, exons 2 and 3 encode the two extracellular domains, exon 4 encodes the transmembrane domain and exon 5 encodes the cytoplasmic tail. Within the DR molecule the beta chain contains all the polymorphisms specifying the peptide binding specificities. Hundreds of DRB1 alleles have been described and typing for these polymorphisms is routinely done for bone marrow and kidney transplantation.

Gene expression 
DRB1 is expressed at a level five times higher than its paralogues DRB3, DRB4 and DRB5. DRB1 is present in all individuals. Allelic variants of DRB1 are linked with either none or one of the genes DRB3, DRB4 and DRB5. There are 5 related pseudogenes: DRB2, DRB6, DRB7, DRB8 and DRB9. 

Prevalence of the HLA-DRB1*10:01 allele was greatly increased in people with anti-IgLON5 disease.

See also 
 HLA-DR

References

Further reading